Masaharu (written: , , , , , , , , ,  or ) is a masculine Japanese given name. Notable people with the name include:

, Japanese writer
, Japanese singer-songwriter, musician and actor
, Japanese general
, Japanese businessman
, Japanese daimyō
, Japanese video game composer
Masaharu Kondo (born 1956), Japanese bureaucrat
, Japanese diplomat
, Japanese businessman
, Japanese chef
, Japanese dermatologist
, Japanese politician
, Japanese politician
, Japanese footballer
, Japanese voice actor
, Japanese footballer
, Japanese swimmer
, Japanese philosopher
, Japanese cinematographer
, Japanese samurai
, Japanese weightlifter
, Japanese cross-country skier
, Japanese daimyō

See also
5850 Masaharu, a main-belt asteroid

Japanese masculine given names